Christian Damián Moreno (born 27 April 1996) is an Argentine professional footballer who plays as a centre-back for Almirante Brown.

Career
Moreno started with Argentine Primera División side Boca Juniors. He was promoted to their first-team by manager Guillermo Barros Schelotto during the 2016 campaign, though he failed to feature but was an unused substitute for a Copa Libertadores tie with Deportivo Cali and for Primera División fixtures with Aldosivi, Argentinos Juniors, Huracán and Estudiantes. On 28 July 2016, Moreno was loaned to fellow Primera División team Defensa y Justicia. He returned twelve months later after no appearances. Defensores de Belgrano of Primera B Metropolitana signed Moreno on loan in 2017.

He made his senior debut with the club on 21 February 2018 during a score draw at home to Talleres, in a season which ended with promotion to the 2018–19 Primera B Nacional. Defensores de Belgrano subsequently completed the permanent signing of Moreno in the following June.

Career statistics
.

References

External links

1996 births
Living people
Footballers from Buenos Aires
Argentine footballers
Association football defenders
Primera B Metropolitana players
Primera Nacional players
Boca Juniors footballers
Defensa y Justicia footballers
Defensores de Belgrano footballers
Club Atlético Acassuso footballers
Club Almirante Brown footballers